ABC Software is a computer and video game software distributor founded in 1991. The initial company was located in Switzerland, and is known as ABC Software Switzerland. Its subsidiary, ABC Software Austria, was established in 1993. They were acquired by Electronic Arts on July 28, 1998.

References

External links
 Website of ABC Software
 Official homepage of Electronic Arts

Electronic Arts
Video game publishers
Video game companies established in 1991
Video game companies of Switzerland
Swiss companies established in 1991
1998 mergers and acquisitions